Michael Barnes (born August 7, 1973) is a retired male judoka from the United States, who won the bronze medal in the men's half heavyweight division (– 100 kg) at the 2003 Pan American Games, alongside Cuba's Oreidis Despaigne.

References
 

1973 births
Living people
American male judoka
Judoka at the 2003 Pan American Games
Pan American Games bronze medalists for the United States
Pan American Games medalists in judo
Medalists at the 2003 Pan American Games